Nora Henriette de Leeuw  is the inaugural executive dean of the Faculty of Engineering and Physical Sciences at University of Leeds. Her research field is computational chemistry and investigates biomaterials, sustainable energy, and carbon capture and storage.

Early life and education 
De Leeuw studied chemistry at the Open University and graduated in 1994. Her doctoral research considered polymorphs of calcium carbonate, which can be used for CO₂ sequestration. She worked as a postdoctoral researcher at the University of Bath until 2000.

Research and career 
De Leeuw is interested in computational models of energy materials, biomaterials and minerals. She uses molecular dynamics and density functional theory. In 2000 she joined the University of Reading as a lecturer in Physical Chemistry. She was awarded an Engineering and Physical Sciences Research Council (EPSRC) Advanced Research Fellowship. She worked as an associate professor in computational materials science at Birkbeck, University of London, from 2004.

She was appointed a professor of computational materials science at University College London in 2007. De Leeuw designed computational models of olivine dust grains, a mineral that is common to the solar system, and studied how it interacted with water at high temperatures. She demonstrated that the grains could hold water at temperatures up to 630 °C. She studied the chemistry of hot vents on the sea floor, which De Leeuw proposed could produce the organic molecules essential for life. She has also investigated biomaterials, such as the carbonated hydroxyapatite present in bone and teeth. She investigated the nucleation of calcium carbonate. De Leeuw was awarded a Royal Society Wolfson Research Merit Award in 2010.

She was awarded a Royal Society industrial fellowship to study how radiation impacted materials for nuclear energy. In 2014 De Leeuw was awarded an Atomic Weapons Establishment (AWE) William Penney Fellowship. At University College London, De Leeuw directed the Centre for Doctoral Training (CDT) in molecular modelling & materials science. She is also a member of the EPSRC programme on energy materials. She uses computer-aided design to create new catalysts for the conversion of carbon dioxide to fuels.

De Leeuw joined Cardiff University in 2015. She is a member of the low-carbon economy research group, an EPSRC supported multi-institutional collaboration that looks to convert carbon dioxide to fuels and chemicals. She leads the Cardiff University - Kwame Nkrumah University of Science and Technology - University of Namibia Chem4Energy programme, which develops novel solar materials and benign catalysts. She holds a professorship in theoretical geochemistry at Utrecht University and University of Paris-Est.

At Cardiff University, de Leeuw works on the university's European strategy and collaborations. These include Horizon 2020, the Erasmus Programme and the Bologna Process.

On 31 May 2019 it was announced that de Leeuw would take up the newly created post of executive dean in the newly formed Faculty of Engineering and Physical Sciences at Leeds University on 1 January 2020.

Awards and honours 
Her awards and honours include:
 2008 Elected a Fellow of the Royal Society of Chemistry (FRSC)
 2016 Elected a Fellow of the Learned Society of Wales (FLSW)
 2017 Elected a member Academia Europaea (MAE)

References 

British women chemists
Fellows of the Royal Society of Chemistry
Alumni of the University of Bath
Academics of Cardiff University
Alumni of the Open University
Year of birth missing (living people)
Living people
British university and college faculty deans
Dutch academic administrators
Fellows of the Learned Society of Wales
Members of Academia Europaea
Academics of Birkbeck, University of London
Academics of University College London
Academics of the University of Leeds
Academic staff of Utrecht University
21st-century Dutch women scientists
Computational chemists
21st-century British women scientists
21st-century Dutch chemists
21st-century British chemists